Batrachedra subglauca is a moth in the family Batrachedridae. It is found in Mongolia.

References

Natural History Museum Lepidoptera generic names catalog

Batrachedridae
Moths of Asia
Moths described in 1979